Novy Spas is a rural locality (a village) in Petushinskoye Rural Settlement, Petushinsky District, Vladimir Oblast, Russia. The population was 7 as of 2010. There are 4 streets.

Geography 
Novy Spas is located on the left bank of the Slezikha River, 20 km northwest of Petushki (the district's administrative centre) by road. Kostino is the nearest rural locality.

References 

Rural localities in Petushinsky District